The Qullpa Jawira (Aymara qullpa saltpeter, jawira river, "saltpeter river", also spelled Collpajahuira, Kollpa Jahuira) is a river in the La Paz  Department in Bolivia. It is a right affluent of the Desaguadero River.

The river originates near  from various streams at a mountain named Taruj Llani south of Utani Apu in the Pacajes Province, Caquiaviri Municipality. It flows in a north-eastern direction.

References

Rivers of La Paz Department (Bolivia)